"Take-off" is the debut single released by the Japanese band Vivid. A document music video was made for the title song and is available on the limited B CD+DVD edition of their major debut (and fifth overall) single ""Yume": Mugen no Kanata" along with a live performance of the title track taped at Shibuya-AX on August 8, 2010. The single reached number 3 on the indies Oricon weekly charts and number 63 on the overall chart where it charted for a week. It has sold 1,319 copies.

Track listing

References

2009 songs
Vivid (band) songs
2009 debut singles